The 2008–09 LNB Pro A season was the 87th season of the French Basketball Championship and the 22nd season since inception of the Ligue Nationale de Basketball (LNB). The regular season started on October 3, 2008 and ended on May 11, 2009. The play-offs were held from May 22, 2009 until June 20, 2009.

ASVEL Lyon-Villeurbanne, after finishing at the top seed of the regular season, won the French Pro A League by defeating Orléans in playoffs final (55-41).

Promotion and relegation 
 At the beginning of the 2008-09 season
Teams promoted from 2007–08 Pro B (French 2nd division)
 Rouen
 Besançon

Teams relegated to 2008–09 Pro B
 Paris-Levallois
 Clermont-Ferrand

 At the end of the 2008-09 season
2008-09 Pro A Champion: ASVEL Lyon-Villeurbanne

Teams promoted from 2008–09 Pro B
 Poitiers
 Paris-Levallois

Teams relegated to 2009–10 Pro B
 Besançon
 Pau-Orthez

Team arenas

Team standings

Playoffs

Awards

Regular Season MVPs 
 Foreign MVP:  Austin Nichols (Hyères-Toulon)
 French MVP:  Alain Koffi (Le Mans)

Best Coach 
  :fr:Philippe Hervé (Orléans)

Most Improved Player 
  Rodrigue Beaubois (Cholet)

Best Defensive Player 
  Tony Dobbins (Orléans)

Rising Star Award 
  Thomas Heurtel (Pau-Orthez)

Player of the month

References

External links
  LNB website

LNB Pro A seasons
French
basketball
basketball